Mystic Your Heart is the second album by Japanese, melodic death metal band Blood Stain Child. It was released on June 18, 2003 on the M&I Company label. This album took on a more European metal sound along the lines of In Flames and Norther than their previous album. Finnish producer Anssi Kippo was hired to give the album that European sound the band was aiming for.

Track listing

  "Be in for Killing Myself" − 3:56
  "∞System" − 2:50
  "The Rise of All the Fall" − 3:45
  "Mystic Your Heart" − 4:16
  "Artificial Mind" − 4:01
  "eM Solution" − 3:09
  "Clone Life" − 3:25
  "The Road to Ruin" − 3:47
  "Deep Silent Memory" − 20:26

External links
 Blood Stain Child Official Site

2003 albums
Blood Stain Child albums